The Belgian Jupiler Women's Basketball League  (French Championnat de Belgique de basketball féminin) is Belgium's basketball tournament among women's teams. The first tournament took place in 1934, won by Schaerbeek. BC Namur-Capitale from Saint-Servais is the biggest overall champion, with 17 titles.

History

Current season teams (2018–19)
 BC Namur-Capitale (Namur)
 Declercq Stortbeton Waregem BC (Waregem)
 Kangoeroes Willebroek (Boom)
 Mithra Castors Braine (Braine-l'Alleud)
 DB Tulikivi Deerlijk (Deerlijk)
 Royal Spirou Monceau (Monceau-sur-Sambre)
 DBC Houthalen (Houthalen)
 BBC Gentson (Ghent)
 KB Oostende-Bredene (Ostend)
 Basket Groot Willebroek (Willebroek)
 Liège Panthers (Liège)

Champions

List of champions

1935 : CAF Schaerbeek
1936 : Fémina Liège
1937 : Fémina Liège
1938 : Fémina Liège
1939 : Fémina Liège
1942 : Fémina Liège
1946 : Atalante Bruxelles
1947 : Atalante Bruxelles
1948 : Etoile BC Gent
1949 : Atalante Bruxelles
1950 : US Anderlecht
1951 : Atalante Bruxelles
1952 : Atalante Bruxelles
1953 : Atalante Bruxelles
1954 : Antwerpse BC
1955 : Antwerpse BC
1956 : Antwerpse BC
1957 : Antwerpse BC
1958 : Antwerpse BC
1959 : Antwerpse BC
1960 : Antwerpse BC
1961 : Standard de Liège Basket
1962 : Standard de Liège Basket
1963 : Standard de Liège Basket
1964 : Standard de Liège Basket
1965 : Etoile Destelbergen
1966 : Royal White Woluwe

1967 : Standard de Liège Basket
1968 : Standard de Liège Basket
1969 : Hellas BC
1970 : Etoile Destelbergen
1971 : BC Le Logis
1972 : BC Le Logis
1973 : SIM Aalst
1974 : Hellas BC
1975 : BC Le Logis
1976 : Amicale Merelbeke
1977 : DBC Aalst
1978 : Amicale Merelbeke
1979 : Stars Destelbergen
1980 : BC Coxyde
1981 : BC Coxyde
1982 : BC Coxyde
1983 : BC Coxyde
1984 : BC Coxyde
1985 : Charles Quint Bruxelles
1986 : Charles Quint Bruxelles
1987 : Charles Quint Bruxelles
1988 : Charles Quint Bruxelles
1989 : Monceau Féminin
1990 : Mini Flat Waregem
1991 : BCSS Namur
1992 : BCSS Namur
1993 : BCSS Namur

1994 : BCSS Namur
1995 : Soubry Courtrai
1996 : Soubry Courtrai
1997 : BCSS Namur
1998 : BCSS Namur
1999 : BCSS Namur
2000 : BCSS Namur
2001 : BCSS Namur
2002 : BCSS Namur
2003 : Dexia Namur
2004 : Dexia Namur
2005 : Dexia Namur
2006 : Dexia Namur
2007 : Dexia Namur
2008 : IMC Dames Waregem
2009 : Dexia Namur
2010 : BBC Wavre-Sainte-Catherine
2011 : IMC Dames Waregem
2012 : Blue Cats Ypres
2013 : BC Namur-Capitale
2014 : Castors Braine
2015 : Castors Braine
2016 : Castors Braine
2017 : Castors Braine
2018 : Castors Braine
2019 : Castors Braine
2020 : Castors Braine

External links
Official website
Profile at eurobasket.com
Basket in Belgium 

Belgium
Basketball in Belgium
Sports leagues established in 1932
Professional sports leagues in Belgium